Boronia amplectens is a plant in the citrus family Rutaceae and is only known from two specimens collected from the Arnhem Land plateau in the Northern Territory of Australia. It is a sprawling shrub with narrow elliptic leaves and four-petalled flowers.

Description
Its branches are covered with star-like hairs.

Taxonomy and naming
Boronia amplectens was first formally described in 1997 by Marco Duretto who published the description in  Australian Systematic Botany. The specific epithet (amplectens) is derived from the Latin word amplector meaning "encircle", "enfold" or "embrace".

Distribution and habitat
This boronia is only known from two plants growing on the Arnhem Land plateau in the Northern Territory.

References 

amplectens 
Flora of the Northern Territory
Plants described in 1997
Taxa named by Marco Duretto